Verdon is a surname. Notable people with the surname include:

George Frederic Verdon (1834–96), English-Australian politician and public figure
Gwen Verdon (1925–2000), Tony Award-winning American dancer and actress
John Verdon (born 1942), American novelist known for detective stories
Jimmy Verdon (born 1981), defensive end in American Football
Philip Verdon (1886–1960), British rower who competed in the 1908 Summer Olympics
René Verdon (1924–2011), French-born American chef